The Telecom Corridor is a technology business center in  Richardson, Texas, a northern suburb of Dallas, which contains over 25 million square feet (2.3 million square meters) of office space and accounts for over 130,000 jobs. More than 5,700 companies, including 600 technology companies are headquartered in the area, including significant players such as AT&T, Alcatel-Lucent, Ericsson, Verizon, Samsung, Texas Instruments, and MetroPCS. Some of these companies also have offices in Telecom Valley located in California. Although the Telecom Corridor was a booming area of Dallas's economy during the late 1990s, the dot-com bust of 2000 hit the region hard. However, it began recovering in 2004, and that recovery has since picked up momentum, gaining both the operations of many non-technology-related companies and many previously non-existent residential units designed in the New Urbanist style. The name "Telecom Corridor" is a registered trademark and may technically only be used to describe the area mentioned in this article.

Telecom Corridor Genealogy Project 
The Telecom Corridor Genealogy Project is a project to enable professionals in the Telcom Corridor to find out about their common history and thereby to enable them to network more easily.

Transportation

Major Highways 
 
 
 President George Bush Turnpike (toll)

Light rail 
 DART: 
 Spring Valley (DART station)
 Arapaho Center (DART station)
 Galatyn Park (DART station)
 Bush Turnpike (DART station)

See also

References

External links 
 Official  Telecom Corridor website

Richardson, Texas
Economy of Dallas
High-technology business districts in the United States